Mozart and Salieri is a 1962 Soviet television drama film directed by Vladimir Gorikker.

Plot 
The film is based on eponymous play of Alexander Pushkin.

Cast 
 Pyotr Glebov as Antonio Salieri (vocal by Alexander Pirogov)
 Innokenty Smoktunovsky as Wolfgang Amadeus Mozart (vocal by Sergei Lemeshev)
Arnolds Mīlbrets as blind musician
Nikolai Kutuzov as black person

References

External links 
 

1962 drama films
1962 films
1960s Russian-language films
Cultural depictions of Antonio Salieri
Films about Wolfgang Amadeus Mozart
Films based on works by Aleksandr Pushkin
Soviet drama films
Soviet television films